The 1994 Colonial Athletic Association baseball tournament was held at Bud Metheny Baseball Complex on the campus of Old Dominion in Norfolk, Virginia, from May 18 through 22.  The event determined the champion of the Colonial Athletic Association for the 1994 season.  Top-seeded  won the tournament for the first time and earned the CAA's automatic bid to the 1994 NCAA Division I baseball tournament.

Entering the event, East Carolina had won the most championships, with five.  George Mason had won two and Richmond had won once.

Format and seeding
The CAA's seven teams were seeded one to seven based on winning percentage from the conference's round robin regular season.  This was the format used in 1992, although abandoned in 1993 in favor of only the top six teams.  They played a double-elimination tournament.

Bracket and results

Most Valuable Player
Matt Quataro was named Tournament Most Valuable Player.  Quataro played first base and outfield for Old Dominion.

References

Tournament
Colonial Athletic Association Baseball Tournament
Colonial Athletic Association baseball tournament
Colonial Athletic Association baseball tournament
Baseball in Virginia
College sports in Virginia
History of Norfolk, Virginia
Sports competitions in Virginia
Sports in Norfolk, Virginia
Tourist attractions in Norfolk, Virginia